Otholobium accrescens is an upright, largely herbaceous subshrub assigned to the Pea family. It has up to three stems that carry upright branches in leaf axils near the ground, and have alternately set inverted egg-shaped leaves and lax heads consisting of 12-21 pea-like flowers on long peduncles in the axils of the lower leaves. It differs from most other Otholobium species by the calyx that continues to grow after flowering and the leaf that consists of just one leaflet. It is an endemic of the Eastern Cape province of South Africa near Loerie. It probably flowers August to January.

Taxonomy 
Specimens of the species have been collected since 1947. Charles Stirton and A. Muthama Muasya considered it sufficiently different from its relatives, described it in 2017, and called it Otholobium accrescens. The name of the genus Otholobium is a combination of the Greek words ὠθέω (ōthéō) meaning to push and λοβός (lobos) meaning pod, which Stirton selected because its fruit seems to be pushed out of the calyx. The species name accrēscēns is Latin, means growing or increasing, and refers to the characteristic that the calyx continues to grow after flowering.

Description 
These stems carry upright branches in the axils of the lower leaves. In contrast to most Otholobium species, the leaf only consists of one leaflet. It in turn carries the single leaflet that can also be shed separately. The first leaflets to appear are smaller than those higher up the stem. The leaflet has a smooth margin, and veins clearly visible on both surfaces. Dried leaflets are densely set with black dot-like glands, more so on the upper surface.

Each flower cluster is subtended by a broadly oval, papery bract, that carries few hairs and is not shed. The four other teeth are lance-shaped, with the edges approximately parallel towards the tube and both lobes at the upside of the flower are fused further than rest. The calyx has a netted pattern of veins, equally sized and equally distributed dot-like glands, and a row of blackish hairs along the edge. The calyx continues to grow after flowering. As in most Faboideae, the corolla is zygomorphic, forms a specialized structure and consists of 5 free petals, of at the moment unknown colour because the species was described from dried specimens, the colour has not been documented when it was collected, and no flowering plants have been observed in the field so far. The blade of the wing is adorned with about 35 irregular ridges in indistinct rows and has one lobe or auricle facing the base. At the tip the ovary extends into a forward sloping style that is thickened at the place where it curves upwards about 2–3 mm from its end. The pistil it topped by a small stigma.

Differences with related species 

Conservation, distribution and ecology 
Otholobium accrescens is known from only two locations. Nonetheless, it is considered a near-threatened species that is likely more common because it is easily overlooked and is probably only noticed in the months after a fire. It occurs near the Groendal and Otterford Forest Reserves, in the Eastern Cape province of South Africa. Specimens of this species may live for over 50 years and the plants resproute from the underground rootstock after fire has destroyed the biomass above the ground. Flowers may be found from August to January. It produces few seeds and probably primarily propagates through its rootstocks.

References 

Otholobium accrescens
Endemic flora of South Africa
Plants described in 2017